Route 755 was a proposed state highway entirely in the city limits of St. Louis, Missouri, that was never built due to local objections. Its northern terminus was to be at an interchange with Interstate 70 (I-70) in the northeastern part of the city and its southern terminus was at an interchange with I-44/I-55. It would have had an interchange with I-64/U.S. Route 40 along the way. The road was proposed as a freeway bypassing the downtown area of St. Louis and would have provided the currently missing connections of northbound I-44/I-55 to westbound I-64 and eastbound I-64 to westbound I-44/I-55 or westbound I-70. It also was to be signed Interstate 755, or I-755.

Route 755 was partially built, in the form of large flyover ramps between I-44/I-55 and I-64/US 40, which lead to local streets. These large interchanges have excess right of way, as well as unused pavement segments. Truman Parkway and long exits to Lafayette Avenue and 20th, Chestnut, Market, and Pine Streets were all that was built of the once proposed and since canceled Route 755.  The ramps from I-64 were closed in February 2020 and removed that winter to make way for a new soccer stadium.

References

External links

 St. Louis and surrounding region highway information
 Map of Proposed Route 755
 North South Distributor Freeway (Missouri 755) on AARoads.com

755
Streets in St. Louis
Cancelled highway projects in the United States
Interstate 55